Bučim is a village in the municipality of Radoviš, North Macedonia.

Demographics
According to the 2002 census, the village had a total of 320 inhabitants. Ethnic groups in the village include:

Turks 320

References

Villages in Radoviš Municipality
Turkish communities in North Macedonia